Hugo Alberto Curioni (born 11 October 1946) is an Argentine former footballer who played as a centre forward. He played professional football in Argentina, France and Mexico.

Argentina

Curioni started his professional career with Instituto de Córdoba in 1969, he was soon spotted by Boca Juniors and signed for them in 1970. In his first season with the club he was part of the championship winning team. He was also equal topscorer in Metropolitano 1973 with Oscar Más and Ignacio Peña.

Curioni is fondly remembered by Boca fans for his goalscoring feats in the Superclásico derby against fierce rivals River Plate. He shares a record of scoring in six consecutive Superclásicos with Paulo Valentim and scored 7 in 11 games overall.

France
Curioni was signed by Nantes and was the third highest scorer in the French league in 1974–1975.

In 1975 Curioni moved to FC Metz where he was third top scorer in 1975–1976 and 4th top scorer in  1976–1977. He then had spells with Montpellier and Troyes.

Later career
Curioni had a spell in Mexico with Toluca and returned to Argentina in March 1980 to finish his career with Gimnasia de La Plata.

Honours
Boca Juniors
 Argentine Primera División: 1970

References

External links

Boca Juniors profile 

1946 births
Living people
Sportspeople from Córdoba Province, Argentina
Argentine people of Italian descent
Argentine footballers
Association football forwards
Argentine Primera División players
Instituto footballers
Boca Juniors footballers
Club de Gimnasia y Esgrima La Plata footballers
Ligue 1 players
FC Nantes players
FC Metz players
Montpellier HSC players
ES Troyes AC players
Liga MX players
Deportivo Toluca F.C. players
Argentine expatriate footballers
Expatriate footballers in Mexico
Expatriate footballers in France
Argentine expatriate sportspeople in Mexico
Argentine expatriate sportspeople in France